The office of the President of Chongqing University, currently held by Wang Shuxin, was created with the founding of Chongqing University in 1929 as the chief executive officer of the school.

After the founding of the Communist State, each president is appointed by and is responsible to the Central Committee of the Chinese Communist Party and the State Council, who is delegated the day-to-day running of the university. In reality, the university President reports to the Party Secretary in the university's Communist Party committee.

Presidents of Chongqing University

Communist Party Secretaries of Chongqing University

References

External links
 

Presidents of Chongqing University
Chongqing University